Big Brother Suomi is the Finnish version of the reality television franchise Big Brother. The Finnish adaptation of Big Brother is broadcast on Sub (formerly SubTV) in Finland from 2005 to 2014.

The series premiered on Sub (formerly SubTV) on 28 August 2005 and the tenth season concluded on November 14, 2014. Since season 7, the series has been produced by Endemol Finland Oy; the previous seasons were produced by Metronome Film & Television Oy. The season winner wins €50,000. In the tenth season, the winner wins €100,000.

On 5 March 2013, Sub announced that the ninth season would air in the fall of 2013 and would be the first season to feature celebrities as contestants. The ninth season was shorter than the previous season and featured only one host.

On January 10, 2019, Nelonen announced the show would be returned in fall 2019 on Jim.

Programmes

Big Brother
Big Brother is the name of the daily show. The daily show has been referred to as both "reality" and "pääohjelma" ("main show") by the hosts. From season 1 to 10, it aired every day at 10 pm. On Sundays, it's included in Big Brother Talk Show. On season 11, it was aired on 9.30 pm.

Big Brother Talk Show/Live
Big Brother Talk Show airs on Sundays during season 1 to 10. It includes clips of the Saturday of housemates, clips from the past week, discussion about the show with varying guests (seasons 1–5) and live eviction. The show has been hosted by Mari Sainio (seasons 1–2), Vappu Pimiä (seasons 3–5), Susanna Laine (seasons 6–7), Elina Viitanen (seasons 6–8) and again by Sainio (season 9–10).

On season 11, Big Brother Suomi Live airs on Sundays, hosted by Elina Kottonen.

Big Brother Extra
Big Brother Extra is aired from Monday to Friday during season 1 to 10. Big Brother Sunnuntai Extra was aired on Sundays during the show's sixth season. The viewers can send SMS messages about the show. The host also interviews Big Brother staff, evicted housemates and other guests. The show has been hosted by Vappu Pimiä (seasons 1–2), Janne Kataja (seasons 3–4), Jani Toivola (season 5), Elina Viitanen (seasons 6–7), Cristal Snow (season 8), Mari Sainio (season 9) and Sauli Koskinen (season 10) .

Overview

References

External links
 Official website
 Big Brother Suomi at Nelonen
 Big Brother Suomi at Ruutu.fi

 
2005 Finnish television series debuts
2014 Finnish television series endings
2000s Finnish television series
2010s Finnish television series
Sub (TV channel) original programming
Nelonen original programming
Jim (TV channel) original programming